Fernando Arias is a Spanish diplomat, who currently serves as the Director-General of the Organisation for the Prohibition of Chemical Weapons (OPCW).

Background 

The appointment of Ambassador Arias followed a consensus recommendation by the OPCW Executive Council in October 2017. Arias was re-appointed for a second four year term on November 30, 2021 

Ambassador Arias is a career diplomat with extensive experience in multilateral diplomacy. Previously, he served as Ambassador of Spain to the Netherlands and the Permanent Representative of Spain to the OPCW. He also has served as Permanent Representative of Spain to the United Nations in New York and Ambassador of Spain to Mali, Mauritania, former Yugoslav Republic of Macedonia, and Bulgaria.

DECORATIONS RECEIVED

Spanish Decorations:

 Commander (Highest Grade), Order of King Carlos III (2004)
 Commander, (Highest Grade) Order of Queen Isabel la Católica (12-03-2012)
 Commander, Order of Queen Isabel la Católica (6-12-1995)
 Official, Order of Queen Isabel la Católica (24-06-1987)
 Commander, Order of Civil Merit (23-06-1990)
 Official, Order of Civil Merit (23-06-1984)
 Cross of the Spanish Police with White Distinctive (2006)

Foreign Decorations:

 Grand Cross, Order of Orange Nassau (The Netherlands)
 Commander, Order Orange Nassau (The Netherlands)
 Official, Order Orange Nassau (The Netherlands)
 Commander, Civil Order of Merit (Islamic Republic of Mauritania)
 Grand Cross, Order of “Mayo” (Argentina)
 Grand Cross, Grand Duchy of Luxembourg
 Grand Cross, Order of Bernardo O’Higgins (Republic of Chile)
 Grand Cross, Order of Honorato Vásquez (Republic of Ecuador)
 Grand Cross, Phoenix Order (Greek Republic)
 Grand Officer, National Orders of Merit (Federal Republic of Germany)
 Grand Cross, Stara Planina (Republic of Bulgaria)
 Grand Cross, Rio Branco (Federal Republic of Brazil)
 Commander, Order of St. Gregory the Great (Vatican)
 Knight, National Order of the Legion of Honour (France)

References

Year of birth missing (living people)
Living people
Spanish diplomats